The New Orleans Rugby Football Club (also known as NORFC), founded in 1973, is a men's rugby union team based in New Orleans, Louisiana, United States. The club competes in and is governed by the True South Geographical Union (GU), and USA Rugby.

Chalie Baleirara is the current head coach.  Joe Rolf is the assistant coach.  

The NORFC practices twice weekly at the Gretna Rugby Pitch located on Gretna Blvd, just off Belle Chase Hwy. in Gretna, Louisiana.

History
The New Orleans Rugby Football Club is currently a member of the True South Rugby Union, Division II. New Orleans Rugby competes against other TSRFU teams such as: Birmingham Rugby Football Club, Memphis Blues Rugby Club, Knoxville Rugby Football Club, Chattanooga Rugby Football Club, Baton Rouge Rugby Football Club and Nashville Rugby Football Club.

NORFC won the USA Rugby South Division II Deep South Pool in 2008, 2009, 2010 and 2011. In 2011, NORFC fielded a 2nd XV in the DIII competition. This team won the Deep South Pool and advanced to the South Finals.  New Orleans won the 2011 DII USA Rugby National Championship, defeating defending champions Tampa Krewe. In 2012, New Orleans' DI side won the South union, but lost in the DI national playoffs to the Chicago Lions. That same year, New Orleans' DIII side went 22-0 and won the USA Rugby DIII National Championship. In 2013, the DI side finished third in the 2013 USA Rugby DI Championship, losing in the semi-finals to Seattle/Old Puget Beach, but then beating the Denver Barbarians for third place.  In 2014, the DI side finished as runner-up to Life University at the 2014 USA Rugby DI Championship.

Former Players of Note

High School Rugby Program
NORFC created the Louisiana High School rugby program,which includes the following Clubs:

 Jesuit Blue Jay Rugby Club 
 Brother Martin Crusader Rugby Club
 Barbarians Rugby Club
 Bayou Hurricanes Rugby Club
 St. Paul's High Rugby Club.

See also
True South Geographical Union
Deep South Rugby Football Union
USA Rugby
Rugby union in the United States

References

External links
Official site
USA Rugby
IRB Official Site

American rugby union teams
Rugby union teams in Louisiana
Sports teams in New Orleans
Rugby clubs established in 1973